Johnny "J. J." Huggins (born March 29, 1976) is a former American football tight end in the National Football League for the Dallas Cowboys. He played college football at Alabama State University and attended Northeast High School in Zachary, Louisiana. He was also a member of the Las Vegas Outlaws, Rhein Fire and Houston Texans.

Early years
Huggins attended Northeast High School, where he was a three-sport athlete. He was named All-state in basketball and All-district in football.

He accepted a football scholarship from Alabama State University. He had 6 receptions for 94 yards as a freshman. The next year, he saw action at quarterback and tight end, registering 8 receptions for 94 yards and one receiving touchdown, 25 out of 69 completions for 395 yards, 3 passing touchdowns, one rushing touchdown and 3 interceptions.

As a junior, he made 15 receptions for 196 yards and one touchdown. He recorded 42 receptions for 506 receiving yards (second on the team), 593 all purpose yards (second on the team) and 6 touchdowns his senior year in 1998, earning First-team All-SWAC honors.

Professional career

Las Vegas Outlaws
Huggins was selected by the Las Vegas Outlaws with the 149th pick in the XFL Draft and played for the Outlaws during the 2001 season.

Dallas Cowboys/Rhein Fire
On February 7, 2001, he was signed as an undrafted free agent by the Dallas Cowboys. He was allocated to NFL Europe and played for the Rhein Fire, tallying 16 receptions for 167 yards, while helping running back Pepe Pearson finish second in the league in rushing (597 yards). In the 2001 season, he played in ten games (2 starts), making 8 receptions for 36 yards.

Houston Texans
Huggins was selected by the Houston Texans with the 19th pick in the 2002 NFL expansion draft. He was released by the Texans on May 20, 2002.

Dallas Cowboys
Huggins signed with the Dallas Cowboys on June 1, 2002 and was released by the team on August 11.

Personal life
Huggins is the nephew of former NFL player Doug Williams. He has also worked as an agent for State Farm.

References

External links
Just Sports Stats

Living people
1976 births
Players of American football from Louisiana
American football tight ends
African-American players of American football
Alabama State Hornets football players
Las Vegas Outlaws (XFL) players
Rhein Fire players
Dallas Cowboys players
21st-century American businesspeople
American businesspeople in insurance
Insurance agents
African-American businesspeople
Businesspeople from Louisiana
People from Zachary, Louisiana
21st-century African-American sportspeople
20th-century African-American sportspeople
Sportspeople from East Baton Rouge Parish, Louisiana